Prince Rupert/Seal Cove Water Aerodrome  is located adjacent to Prince Rupert, British Columbia, Canada. Inland Air, Ocean Pacific Air, Helijet and Lakelse Air (Universal Helicopters) are users of this aerodrome.

It is classified as an aerodrome and as an airport of entry by Nav Canada, and is staffed by the Canada Border Services Agency (CBSA). CBSA officers at this airport can handle general aviation aircraft only, with no more than 15 passengers.

Airlines and destinations

See also
 List of airports in the Prince Rupert area

References

External links

Seaplane bases in British Columbia
Transport in Prince Rupert, British Columbia
Registered aerodromes in British Columbia